This is a list of town tramway systems in Argentina by Province.  It includes all tram systems, past and present.

Buenos Aires Province

Buenos Aires City 

Also: Heritage tramway in the Caballito district opened 15 Nov 1980.

Neighboring and suburban tramway systems in Buenos Aires Province, arranged anti- (counter-) clockwise, northwest to southeast.

Catamarca

Chaco

Córdoba

Note for Villa María: Tramway constructed in 1911, using materials salvaged from closed system at Bell Ville and tramcars equipped with internal-combustion engines. Not opened because of construction deficiencies

Corrientes

Entre Ríos

La Pampa

Mendoza

Salta

San Juan

Santa Fe

Tucumán

References

Books, Periodicals and External Links

See also

Trams in Buenos Aires
List of town tramway systems
List of town tramway systems in South America
List of light-rail transit systems
List of rapid transit systems
List of trolleybus systems

Tramways
Argentina